Kwa or KWA may refer to:
 Karegnondi Water Authority, Michigan, USA
 Khmer Writers' Association, Cambodia

Languages 
 Kwa languages, or New Kwa
 Volta–Niger languages, or East Kwa
 Baa language, or Kwa / Kwah, of Nigeria
 Kwa' language of Cameroon
 Dâw language, a Nadahup language spoken by 100 people, Amazonas, Brazil

People 
 Kwa Geok Choo, Singaporean lawyer
 Kwah, a Dakelh leader

Places 
 Kwah River,  Congo 
 Great Kwa River, Nigeria
 Bucholz Army Airfield, Kwajalein Island, Marshall Islands, IATA code